Van Dorn Street is a Washington Metro station straddling the boundary between Fairfax County and the independent city of Alexandria in Virginia, United States. The station’s island platform lies in unincorporated Rose Hill in Fairfax County, while the station’s entrance and parking facilities are in Alexandria. The station was opened on June 15, 1991, and is operated by the Washington Metropolitan Area Transit Authority (WMATA). Providing service for the Blue Line, the station is located at South Van Dorn Street and Eisenhower Avenue, next to the Capital Beltway. From 1991 to 1997 it was the southwestern terminus of the Blue Line.

History
In June 1977, the city of Alexandria, Southern Railway, and the United Parcel Service reached an agreement allowing for Metro to retain the air rights for the construction of the Van Dorn station when funding became available. After years of planning, in March 1987 Metro awarded a $32.3 million contract to complete the station by 1991 to Dillingham Construction of Pleasanton, California. Originally slated to be part of the Yellow Line, in early 1990 it was decided Van Dorn would be served by the Blue Line with the Yellow Line being shifted to the Huntington station. Van Dorn Street would remain as the southwestern terminus of the Blue Line from its completion through the opening of the Franconia–Springfield station on June 29, 1997.

On June 25, 2017, Yellow Line trains stopped serving the station due to the elimination of Rush+, which is part of major changes to the Metrorail system.

In May 2018, Metro announced an extensive renovation of platforms at twenty stations across the system. The Blue and Yellow Lines south of Ronald Reagan Washington National Airport station, including the Van Dorn Street station, would be closed from May to September 2019. The platform at this station would then be rebuilt starting in September 2019, necessitating single-track operations on the Blue Line for several weeks. A nearby rail bridge will also be rebuilt during the reconstruction.

From March 26, 2020, until June 28, 2020, this station was closed due to the 2020 coronavirus pandemic.

Between September 10, 2022 and November 5, 2022, Van Dorn Street was closed due to the Potomac Yard station tie-in, closing all stations south of Ronald Reagan Washington National Airport station. Shuttle buses were provided throughout the shutdown.

Station layout
The station has an island platform situated between Eisenhower Avenue and the RF&P Subdivision tracks, which carry Virginia Railway Express and Amtrak trains. North of the station is a loop of bus bays serving DASH, Fairfax Connector, and Metrobus routes. A tunnel underneath Eisenhower Avenue leads to a small parking lot.

References

External links
 

 The Schumin Web Transit Center: Van Dorn Street Station
 Station from Google Maps Street View

Washington Metro stations in Virginia
Transportation in Alexandria, Virginia
Stations on the Blue Line (Washington Metro)
Railway stations in the United States opened in 1991
1991 establishments in Virginia
Transportation in Fairfax County, Virginia